Cristóbal or Cristobal, the Spanish version of Christopher, is a masculine given name and a surname which may refer to:

Given name
Cristóbal Balenciaga (1895–1972), Spanish fashion designer
Cristóbal Cobo (born 1976), Chilean academic
Cristóbal Colón Ruiz (born 1954), Puerto Rican politician
Cristóbal de Morales (1500–1553), Spanish composer
Cristóbal de Olid (1487–1524), Spanish conquistador
Cristóbal Halffter (1930–2021), Spanish composer
Cristóbal Lander (born 1978), Venezuelan actor and model
Cristóbal López (disambiguation), multiple people
Cristóbal Magallanes Jara (1869–1927), Mexican martyr and Catholic saint
Cristóbal Márquez Crespo (born 1984), Cuban association football player known as simply Cristóbal
Cristóbal Mendoza (1772–1829), Venezuelan president
Cristóbal Oudrid (1825–1877), Spanish composer
Cristóbal Orellana (born 1983), Mexican actor and singer
Cristóbal Parralo (born 1967), Cuban association football player known as simply Cristóbal
Cristóbal Pérez (born 1952), Colombian cyclist
Cristóbal Rojas (disambiguation), multiple people
Cristobal Tapia de Veer (born 1973), Chilean-Canadian composer and producer

Surname
Adrian Cristobal (1932–2007), Filipino writer
Carmen Lelia Cristóbal, Argentinian professor of botany
Everardo Cristóbal (born 1986), Mexican sprint canoeist
Geronimo Cristobal (born 1986), Filipino writer, art critic
Mario Cristobal (born 1970), American football coach

Spanish masculine given names